Vilma Louise Abrahamsson (born 22 February 1999) is a Swedish football player who plays for Selånger FK as a defender.

Abrahamsson helped Selånger achieve their first victory in Division 1 Norrland dam on 24 August 2019.

References

Swedish women's footballers
1999 births
Living people
Women's association football defenders
Footballers from Stockholm